Nyaungyan is a town in Mandalay Region, Myanmar.

References

Populated places in Mandalay Region